MI1 or British Military Intelligence, Section 1 was a department of the British Directorate of Military Intelligence, part of  the War Office. It was set up during World War I. It contained "C&C", which was responsible for code breaking.

Its subsections in World War I were:
 MI1a: Distribution of reports, intelligence records.
 MI1b: Interception and cryptanalysis.
 MI1c: The Secret Service/SIS.
 MI1d: Communications security.
 MI1e: Wireless telegraphy.
 MI1f: Personnel and finance.
 MI1g: Security, deception and counter intelligence.

In 1919 MI1b and the Royal Navy's (NID25) "Room 40" were closed down and merged into the inter-service Government Code and Cypher School (GC&CS), which subsequently developed into the Government Communications Headquarters (GCHQ) at Cheltenham.

Oliver Strachey was in MI1 during World War I. He transferred to GC&CS and served there during World War II. John Tiltman was seconded to MI1 shortly before it merged with Room 40.

Notes

References
 What happened to MI1 - MI4?
  Updated and extended version of Action This Day: From Breaking of the Enigma Code to the Birth of the Modern Computer Bantam Press 2001
 Gannon, Paul, Inside Room 40: The Codebreakers of World War I, Ian Allan Publishing, 2011, 

Cryptography organizations
Defunct United Kingdom intelligence agencies
1910s establishments in the United Kingdom
Military units and formations disestablished in 1919
United Kingdom in World War I
Military communications of the United Kingdom